The 2021–22 Omaha Mavericks men's basketball team represented the University of Nebraska Omaha in the 2021–22 NCAA Division I men's basketball season. The Mavericks, led by 17th-year head coach Derrin Hansen, played their home games at Baxter Arena in Omaha, Nebraska, as members of the Summit League.

Previous season
The Mavericks finished the 2020–21 season 5–20, 3–11 in Summit League play to finish in eighth place. They lost to South Dakota State in the quarterfinals of the Summit League tournament.

Roster

Schedule and results

|-
!colspan=12 style=| Non-conference regular season

|-
!colspan=9 style=| Summit League regular season

|-
!colspan=9 style=|Summit League tournament

Sources

References

Omaha Mavericks men's basketball seasons
Omaha Mavericks
Omaha Mavericks men's basketball
Omaha Mavericks men's basketball